Sarkis Ordyan (December 20, 1918 – 2003) was a Ukrainian-Armenian painter.

Biography 
He was born to unknown parents in the village of Aigedzor, in the Shamshadin region of Armenia (now part of the Tavush province).  Ordyan was married to Arevhat Grigoryan and had two children, Rafik Ordyan and Anahit Ordyan.
 
Ordyan left Armenia for Moldova where he lived for several years until settling in Ukraine. In the city of Odessa, he became known as "the Lonely Painter".  Ordyan died in 2003, and is buried in Odessa, Ukraine.

Few of Ordyan's works survive today. Some are in the possession of private collectors, some of which are in Armenia.

References
 Kardashian, Albert. "Karhat Ghoolali Aigedzor" Mankavarj publishing, Yerevan 1999.

1918 births
2003 deaths
People from Tavush Province
Ukrainian people of Armenian descent
20th-century Ukrainian painters
20th-century Ukrainian male artists
20th-century Armenian painters
Ukrainian male painters
Soviet painters